Kenneth Holmes Cave (25 February 1874 – 19 May 1944) was a New Zealand cricket umpire. He stood in six Test matches between 1930 and 1933.

Ken Cave was a member of a large family of cricketers in the Whanganui area. A middle-order batsman, he played for Whanganui teams from the late 1890s till the mid-1920s, and was one of their leading batsmen when they held the Hawke Cup in 1914-15 and 1925–26. 

He became an umpire in the Whanganui area in the 1920s. Without having umpired a first-class match, but with the support of the English touring team, he was chosen to umpire all four matches in New Zealand's first Test series, against England in 1929-30. He also umpired two of New Zealand's other four home Tests in the 1930s.

Cave's nephew Harry Cave captained the New Zealand Test team in the 1950s.

See also
 List of Test cricket umpires

References

1874 births
1944 deaths
Sportspeople from Sunderland
New Zealand Test cricket umpires
British emigrants to New Zealand